Noah Christoffer Jensen (born July 20, 1999) is a Canadian soccer player who most recently played for Forge FC in the Canadian Premier League.

College career
Jensen played five seasons of NCAA soccer with the Oakland Golden Grizzlies. He assisted the winning goal in his first regular season game on August 25, 2017 and went on to be named to the Horizon League All-Freshman Team. He scored his first goal for Oakland in his sophomore season on September 2, 2018 on a penalty against the Loyola Ramblers. In 2018, he was name a Horizon League All-Academic Team. In 2019, he was named team captain and named to the All-Horizon League Second Team and United Soccer Coaches NCAA Division I Men's Scholar All-North/Central Region First Team. In his fourth season 2020-21, he was named 2021 Horizon League Player of the Year, an All-Horizon League first team selection, a second team All-American and was a finalist for the MAC Hermann Trophy, while leading all players in the nation in assists with 14. In his final year, he helped the Golden Grizzlies win the Horizon League regular season and conference tournament championships and was awarded the tournament's most valuable player award.  He was also named an All-Horizon League first team selection for the second consecutive year. He also won the 2021 Senior CLASS Award.

Club career
From 2016 to 2019, he played in League1 Ontario with Sigma FC. He scored his first goal on May 18, 2019 against Master's FA.

In 2021, he joined the Flint City Bucks in USL League Two. He scored his first goal on June 29, scoring the winning goal in the 90th minute in a 2-1 victory over the South Bend Lions. In the final regular season match of the season on July 10, Jensen recorded four assists in a 4-0 victory over Oakland County FC.

In February 2022, he signed with Forge FC of the Canadian Premier League. He made his debut on February 24 in a CONCACAF Champions League match against Mexican side Cruz Azul at Estadio Azteca. On May 14, he scored his first goal for the club, scoring the equalizer from 30 yards out, in a 1-1 draw with Atlético Ottawa. In 2022, he won the CPL Championship with Forge.

International career
In December 2022, Jensen was called up to a camp with the Canada national futsal team.

Career statistics

Club

References

External links

Golden Grizzlies statistics

1999 births
Living people
Canadian soccer players
Association football midfielders
Oakland Golden Grizzlies men's soccer players
Sigma FC players
League1 Ontario players
Flint City Bucks players
USL League Two players
Forge FC players
Canadian Premier League players